Sumit Nagal was the defending champion but lost in the quarterfinals to Saketh Myneni.

Prajnesh Gunneswaran won the title after defeating Myneni 6–2, 6–2 in the final.

Seeds

Draw

Finals

Top half

Bottom half

References
Main Draw
Qualifying Draw

Bengaluru Open - Singles
2018 Singles